The Canadian Junior Track and Field Championships is an annual track and field competition sanctioned by Athletics Canada. It serves as the Canadian junior national championships for the sport. The event is to be held in Blainville/St.-Thérèse, Quebec in the years 2013 and 2014. In 2013 the event attracted 546 athletes -- 297 male and 249 female. The 2014 event took place from July 4th to 5th.

References

Under-20 athletics competitions
Track and field competitions in Canada
National athletics competitions
Annual sporting events in Canada